The Kokomo Wild Cats was the only known moniker of the minor league baseball teams based in Kokomo, Indiana between 1890 and 1909. Kokomo teams played as members of the Indiana State League in 1890, 1896 and 1900, the Indiana–Illinois League in 1899, Ohio-Indiana League in 1907 and Northern State of Indiana League in 1909.

The Kokomo Wild Cats were succeeded by the 1955 Kokomo Giants, who played as members of the Mississippi-Ohio Valley League

History
Kokomo first hosted minor league baseball in 1890. When the Independent level Indiana State League expanded and played as an eight–team league in 1890, the Kokomo team joined the league. The 1890 member teams joining Kokomo to begin the season were teams representing the Indiana cities of Anderson, Bluffton, Elkhart, Fort Wayne Reds, Marion, Muncie and Peru. The Kokomo team finished the season in 4th place with a record of 29–29, playing under manager Frank Jones. Kokomo ended the season in a virtual tie with the Logansport Ottos in the final standings.

The 1896 Kokomo team resumed play as members of the six–team Independent level Indiana State League. The league played briefly, with Kokomo placing 3rd with a 4–4 record. The league began play on July 26, 1986 and folded on August 4, 1896.

The Kokomo team played briefly as members of the 1899 Indiana–Illinois League before relocating. On June 30, 1899, Kokomo had a 21–17 record when the franchise relocated to Mattoon, Illinois. The franchise reportedly relocated to become the Mattoon team when the Kokomo home ballpark went into receivership due to a $125 debt.

In 1900, Kokomo resumed play when the Indiana State League reformed as a six–team league for the 1900 season.  On June 10, 1900, the league folded with Kokomo in 5th place with a 8–16 record under manager Edward Hill. When the Logansport/Elwood and Muncie teams both disbanded on June 10, 1900, causing the entire league to fold. Kokomo finished 9.0 games behind the Wabash Farmers, who were in 1st place with a 19–9 record when the league disbanded.

In 1907, Kokomo partnered with neighboring Sharpsville, Indiana as the Kokomo-Sharpsville team became members of the Class D level Ohio-Indiana League. The team played under manager Frank Morris and finished in 3rd place with a 24–22 record. Kokomo finished 3.5 games behind the 1st place Decatur Admirals in the final standings of the six–team league. The Ohio-Indiana League did not return to play in the 1908 season.

In 1909, the Kokomo "Wild Cats" became members of the six–team Class D level Northern State of Indiana League. The Wild Cats ended the season in 4th place with a record of 50–53, playing under manager Ed Hill. Kokomo ended the season 15.0 games behind the 1st place Bluffton Babes, who won the league championship with a 65–38 record. The Kokomo Wild Cats folded after the 1909 season, replaced by the Logansport Whitecaps franchise in the six–team 1910 Northern State of Indiana League

Kokomo, Indiana was without minor league baseball until 1955, when the Kokomo Giants began play as members of the Mississippi-Ohio Valley League.

Beginning in 2014, Kokomo became home to the collegiate summer baseball level Kokomo Jackrabbits who began play as members of the Northwoods League.

The ballpark
The name of the Kokomo home minor league ballpark is unknown.

Timeline

Year–by–year records

Notable alumni

Con Lucid (1890)
Everett Scott (1909) Boston Red Sox Hall of Fame
Ed Smith (1900)
Cal Vasbinder (1900)

See also
Kokomo Wild Cats players

References

External links
Baseball Reference

Professional baseball teams in Indiana
Defunct baseball teams in Indiana
Baseball teams established in 1909
Baseball teams disestablished in 1909
Northern State of Indiana League teams
Sports in Kokomo, Indiana